Braguinha may refer to:
 Braguinha or Cavaquinho, a string instrument of the guitar family
 Braguinha (composer) (1907–2006), Brazilian songwriter